The Fender Vibroverb was a 40-watt combo guitar amplifier originally manufactured in 1963 and 1964. It was the first Fender amplifier to incorporate on-board reverb and tremolo/vibrato, which became a standard feature on many high-end Fender tube amps during the 1960s and 1970s.

Brown panel, brown Tolex-the 1963 Vibroverb 
The original (6G16 circuit) Vibroverb was introduced in February 1963. The speaker lineup and the output transformer were based on the Fender Super amp of the time and the circuit based on the Fender Vibrolux of the time, with no presence control and only one 12AX7 tube for the tremolo effect. It sported typical "brownface" cosmetics, with brown "Tolex" covering (introduced by Fender in 1959), and wheat-colored speaker cloth.

The 40-watt amplifier boasted two channels (NORMAL and BRIGHT). Both channels had VOLUME, TREBLE and BASS controls; the single-control REVERB affected only the BRIGHT channel.

The tremolo effect (labeled VIBRATO by Fender, see "VIBRATO or TREMOLO?" section of the article vibrato unit) had two controls, SPEED and also INTENSITY, which affected the bias of the output tubes and therefore both channels. To make room for the reverb circuitry (not found on the Super amp) the company used the direct-coupled oscillator vibrato circuitry found on Fender's previous generation tweed amplifiers (which used two tubes fewer than the Super's brownface vibrato circuit).

The TREBLE control was the same as found in many Fender amplifiers of the time (i.e., Pro Amp -6G5A-, the Super -6G4A-, the Showman -6G14-, the Vibrolux -6G11-). It was fitted with a "tapped" treble circuit, meaning that the treble control is "flat" at setting "5"; cutting or boosting the treble was possible by turning the knob down (below "5") or up (above "5"), respectively.

It had two ten-inch speakers manufactured by the Oxford Speaker Company.

This incarnation of the Vibroverb was made for only a few months, and it is thought that fewer than 600 of these units were made.

Tube complement:
Power:............6L6GC (Two)

Wattage: 35 wattsPreamp:...........7025 (Two)
Phase Inverter:...7025
Rectifier:........GZ34
Tremolo/Vibrato:..12AX7
Reverb Driver:....12AX7
Reverb Recovery:..7025

Switch To black panel, black Tolex-the 1964 Vibroverb 
Fender revamped their entire amplifier line in the fall of 1963. Several models were introduced or greatly modified from their previous incarnation. The Super had two additional ten-inch speakers and a reverb circuit added; it became the much-sought-after black panel Super Reverb. The Twin was given two twelve-inch speakers and reverb; it became the legendary black panel Twin Reverb.

The Vibroverb, likewise, was given the new black panel cosmetics and somewhat different circuitry (AA763). Still rated at 40 watts, the new design possessed the new black panel "optical coupler" vibrato circuit (in place of the tweed-style vibrato found in its immediate predecessor), and a bright switch.

Gone also were the two ten-inch Oxford speakers; in their place was a single fifteen-inch speaker. Jensen speakers were used, with JBL available as an extra cost option.

Production on the black panel Vibroverb was discontinued in late 1964.

Tube complement:
Power:............6L6GC (Two)

Wattage?Preamp:...........7025 (Two)
Phase Inverter:...12AT7
Rectifier:........GZ34
Tremolo/Vibrato:..12AX7
Reverb Driver:....12AT7
Reverb Recovery:..12AX7

Historic Fame 
Due to low production numbers and their use by Stevie Ray Vaughan, 1964 (blackface) Vibroverbs have become highly collectable. Vaughan acquired two 1964 blackface Vibroverbs in the late 1970s or early 1980s at two different times and locations, thought to have sequential serial numbers, but were sequential production numbers (#5 and #6). The Vibroverbs used by Vaughan were also modified by Cesar Diaz in a number of ways (see "'64 Vibroverb Custom" below).

'63 Re-issue Vibroverb (1990–1995) 
As demand for vintage Fender tube amplifiers had increased, several re-issue models were introduced in 1990, beginning with the tweed '59 Bassman amplifier, the brownface '63 Reverb unit and the brownface '63 Vibroverb.

Fender made great efforts to reproduce the tone and look of the original unit. A "direct-coupled" oscillator circuit was used for generating the vibrato (albeit with different components). The noticeably "warmer" reverb sound of a vintage brownface Vibroverb (due to the original reverb send and recovery circuit unique to the Vibroverb) was also present. The cosmetics incorporated the brown "Tolex" and wheat-colored "Ecru" grill cloth used in 1963, as well as the "flat" Fender logo plate found only on the brownface amps.

Although cosmetically and—more importantly—tonally accurate, there were several notable differences to be found (solid-state rectifier, printed circuit boards, ¼" reverb/vibrato footswitch jack, 3-prong power cord). Fender used the original templates, molds and blueprints from the Oxford company archives to manufacture Oxford-style loudspeakers. The Fender '63 Reissue Vibroverb listed for $900 (US) when it was released in 1990.

Notable users of the '63 Re-issue Vibroverb include Richard Thompson, Jeff Buckley, and the Screamin' Armadillos frontman Matt Abney.

Tube complement: (stock tubes were "Fender Special Design")
Power:............6L6WGC (Two)

Wattage?Preamp:...........12AX7A (Two)
Phase Inverter:...12AX7A
Rectifier:........Solid State Diode
Tremolo/Vibrato:..12AX7A
Reverb Driver:....12AT7
Reverb Recovery:..12AX7A
Circuit:......6G16

'64 Vibroverb Custom (2003–2008) 
Due to the continued popularity of Stevie Ray Vaughan, in 2001 Fender began collaborating with Cesar Diaz to re-create the modified 1964 blackface Vibroverbs that were used by Vaughan throughout his career. The amp debuted in early 2003.

Several modifications were made. A toggle switch mounted on the back of the amplifier chassis allows switching between tube (the original) and solid-state rectification; in the latter mode, output is boosted to 50 watts. A second toggle switch allows the player to disable the Normal channel and the Vibrato effect; the preamp gain is increased, and more distortion and sustain is available. This version of the amplifier has a fifteen-inch Eminence speaker and is hand-wired.

Tube complement:
Power:............GT-6L6 GE (Two)

Wattage:............ 50 wattsPreamp:...........12AX7 (Two)
Phase Inverter:...12AT7
Rectifier:........5U4 GB USA or GZ34 or Solid State Diode (switchable)
Tremolo/Vibrato:..12AX7
Reverb Driver:....12AT7
Reverb Recovery:..12AX7
Circuit:.....AA763

References

Instrument amplifiers
V